Fygen Lutzenkirchen (1450-1515) was a German merchant.    She managed a major silk trading house in Cologne. She was elected Mistress (Master) of the Silk Weaving Guild. There are several memorials over her in Cologne, were she became a famous local history figure.

References

1468 births
16th-century German businesswomen
1515 deaths
15th-century German businesspeople
15th-century German women
Medieval businesswomen
Businesspeople from Cologne